Jack Grainger may refer to:

 Jack Grainger (footballer, born 1912), English professional footballer
 Jack Grainger (footballer, born 1924), English professional footballer

See also
John Grainger (disambiguation)